The Drilliidae are a taxonomic family of small predatory sea snails with high-spired shells. They are classified as marine gastropod mollusks in the superfamily Conoidea.

This family has no subfamilies. It consists of about 30 genera and approximately 500 Recent species.

Description
The shell is claviform with a tall spire, or squatly conical to biconical. In many species, the siphonal canal is truncated. The aperture is U-shaped with a parietal callus pad.

The sculpture of the shell shows prominent axial ribs with a polished surface. Most species have a dorsal varix (transverse elevation), except in the genera Cymatosyrinx, Elaeocyma and Splendrillia. The protoconch can be smooth or very carinate. The ovate operculum has a terminal nucleus.

The radula of the species in this family have characteristically five teeth in each row (formula : 1 + 1 + 1 + 1 + 1) with a vestigial central tooth, comb-like lateral teeth  and a pair of flat-pointed, slender marginal teeth.

The foregut structure of the anterior alimentary system has the least derived foregut anatomy of all the families in the superfamily Conoidea.

Distribution
This family has wide distribution, ranging from Iceland to the Antarctic Ocean, found at intertidal to abyssal depths. This is reflected in the variability in larval shells and the size of the shell (from a few millimetres to 6 cm) and the characteristics of the protoconch and the teleoconch.

Taxonomic history
The genera in this family were originally separated from the subfamily Clavitulinae and classified by H.& A. Adams (1858) under subfamily Turritinae, because their operculum has a terminal instead of a central nucleus. In 1942, the species with a U-shaped sinus and a parietal callus pad were brought by Powell in the new subfamily Clavinae. In 1966, Morrison proposed the subfamily Drillinae (= Clavinae) for the species with a stenoglossan radula with comb-like lateral teeth. Finally, in 1993, Taylor et al. proposed the promotion of Drillinae from subfamily to the family level Drilliidae.

Taxonomy
Genera in the family Drilliidae include:

 Acinodrillia Kilburn, 1988
 Agladrillia Woodring, 1928
 Bellaspira Conrad, 1868
 Calliclava McLean, 1971
 Cerodrillia Bartsch & Rehder, 1939
 Clathrodrillia Dall, 1918
 Clavus Montfort, 1810
 Conopleura Hinds, 1844 
 Crassopleura Monterosato, 1884
 Cruziturricula Marks, 1951 
 Cymatosyrinx Dall, 1889
 Decoradrillia Fallon, 2016 
 Douglassia Bartsch, 1934
 Drillia Gray, 1838
 Elaeocyma Dall, 1918
 Eumetadrillia Woodring, 1928 
 Fenimorea Bartsch, 1934
 Fusiturricula Woodring, 1928 
 Globidrillia Woodring, 1928
 Hauturua Powell, 1942 
 Imaclava Bartsch, 1944
 Iredalea Oliver, 1915
 Kylix Dall, 1919
 Leptadrillia Woodring, 1928
 Lissodrillia Bartsch & Rehder, 1943
 Neodrillia Bartsch, 1943
 Orrmaesia Kilburn, 1988
 Paracuneus Laseron, 1954
 Plagiostropha Melvill, 1927
  † Pleurofusia de Gregorio, 1890
 Sedilia Fargo, 1953
 Spirotropis Sars, 1878
 Splendrillia Hedley, 1922
 Stenodrillia Korobkov, 1955 
 Syntomodrillia Hedley, 1922
 Wairarapa Vella, 1954

Genera brought into synonymy
 Brephodrillia Pilsbry & Lowe, 1932: synonym of Iredalea
 Clavicantha Swainson, 1840: synonym of Clavus Montfort, 1810
 Eldridgea Bartsch, 1934: synonym of Clavus Montfort, 1810
 Fusisyrinx Bartsch, 1934: synonym of Fusiturricula Woodring, 1928
 Tylotia Melvill, 1917: synonym of Clavus Montfort, 1810
 Tylotiella Habe, 1958: synonym of Clavus Montfort, 1810
Genera moved to other families
 Austroclavus (unassigned to a family within Conoidea)
 Brachytoma moved to the family Pseudomelatomidae
 Sediliopsis Petuch, 1988 : moved to the family Pseudomelatomidae

References

 The Taxonomicon

External links
 PHILLIP J. Jr. FALLON, Taxonomic review of tropical western Atlantic shallow water Drilliidae (Mollusca: Gastropoda: Conoidea) including descriptions of 100 new species;  Zootaxa, [S.l.], v. 4090, n. 1, p. 1–363, mar. 2016. ISSN 1175-5334
 WMSDB - Worldwide Mollusc Species Data Base: family Drilliidae

 
Conoidea